The European Confederation of Roller Skating (CERS), currently branded as World Skate Europe (WSE; infrequently as 'World Skate Europa'), is a governing body of roller skating and inline skating in Europe. The World Skate Europe is a member of World Skate, formerly the International Roller Sports Federation (FIRS). 

Due to the 2022 Russian invasion of Ukraine, World Skate banned Russian and Belarusian athletes and officials from its competitions, and will not stage any events in Russia or Belarus in 2022.

Sports
World Skate Europe is the highest regulating body of six roller sport disciplines in Europe:

 Artistic roller skating and inline figure skating
 Freestyle skating
 Inline hockey
 Inline speed skating
 Roller hockey
 Skateboarding*

*Skateboarding does not have a representative member in the Central Committee of World Skate Europe

Subsidiaries 

World Skate Europe - Artistic Skating (WSE Artistic)
previously known as the Comite European de Patinage Artistico or CEPA
President: Margaret Brooks (Falerone, Italy)
World Skate Europe - Inline Freestyle (WSE Freestyle)
President: Vladimir Tkachev (Moscow, Russia)
 World Skate Europe - Inline Hockey (WSE In-Line Hockey) 
also known as the Comité Européen de Roller In Line Hockey or CERILH
President: Boris Darlet (Bordeaux, France)
 World Skate Europe - Speed Skating (WSE Speed) 
also known as the Comité Européen de Course or CEC
World Skate Europe - Rink Hockey (WSE Rink-Hockey)
also known as the Comité Européen de Rink-Hockey or CERH
President: Agostinho Peixoto da Silva (Porto, Portugal)
World Skate Europe - Skateboarding
President: Luca Basilico (Lombardy, Italy)

See also
World Roller Games

References

External links
 

Rol
Roller skating organizations